Cartwheel or Cartwheels  may refer to:

Transport
A cart wheel, usually spelled "cartwheel"

Gymnastics
Cartwheel (gymnastics), an acrobatic maneuver
Aerial cartwheel, an acrobatic move in which a cartwheel is executed without touching hands to the floor

Business
Cartwheel Books, an imprint of Scholastic Corporation
Cartwheel Records, a former record label based in Nashville, Tennessee
Target Cartwheel, a savings app from Target Corporation

Currency
Cartwheel, nickname for some Hanoverian-era British coins
Cartwheel, slang term for a silver dollar coin (United States)

Music
 Cartwheels, a 1995 album by Anthony Thistlethwaite
 Cartwheels, a 2014 EP by Frenchy and the Punk
 Cartwheels, a 2016 album by Ward Thomas

Other uses
Cartwheel cell, a type of neuron
Cartwheel Galaxy
Cartwheel hat, worn by women
Operation Cartwheel, a major military strategy for the Allies in the Pacific theater of World War II

See also
 Cart
 Wheel